Ganz in Weiß is a song written by Rolf Arland (music) and Kurt Hertha (lyrics) and recorded by Roy Black in 1965. He also recorded an English version I need you and an Italian version Grazie mille, both released in 1966 

A 1966 Östen Warnerbring recording named En sommardröm charted at Svensktoppen between 6 August 1966- – 4 February 1967, and topped the chart.

Chart trajectories

References

1966 singles
German-language songs
Number-one singles in Austria
Number-one singles in Germany
Östen Warnerbring songs